"Cold Wind" is a single by Canadian indie rock band Arcade Fire. The song is not found on any of their studio albums. It was released in August 2005 via Merge Records, and was featured on the television soundtrack album Six Feet Under, Vol. 2: Everything Ends. The song was played live during the band's encore on June 1, 2007 at Berkeley's Hearst Greek Theatre, as the song's lyrics refer to San Francisco.

The single was pressed on clear 7" vinyl and featured the band's cover of "Brazil" (a.k.a. "Aquarela do Brasil"). The single is out of print.

Track listing
 "Cold Wind" – 3:12
 "Brazil" – 3:54

External links
Merge Records: Arcade Fire Discography

Arcade Fire songs
2005 singles
2005 songs
Merge Records singles
Songs written by William Butler (musician)
Songs written by Win Butler
Songs written by Régine Chassagne
Songs written by Tim Kingsbury
Songs written by Richard Reed Parry